Creepin on ah Come Up is the debut EP by American hip hop group Bone Thugs-N-Harmony. The album was released on June 21, 1994, on Ruthless Records. In 1998, the album was selected as one of The Source's 100 Best Rap Albums.

History
Bone Thugs-n-Harmony's first album includes the singles "Thuggish Ruggish Bone" and "Foe tha Love of $". Features on the album include vocalist Shatasha Williams and their mentor and executive producer Eazy-E. The first two lines of "Intro" are backwards. Played forward are "Heaven in art which Father our, Our Father which art in Heaven" Tracks 3, 4 and 6 have listed, "Keenu Songs" which is "U-Neek" spelled backwards. In The Source (8-97) article "Crossroads To Riches" Bone states that they changed their name to Bone Thugs-n-Harmony because they had a song called "Thugs-N-Harmony".

Parts of "Foe tha Love of $" (including Jewell's backing vocals) are recycled from the Yomo & Maulkie track "For the Love of Money", from their 1991 album Are U Xperienced?. The closing track on Creepin on ah Come Up, "Moe Cheese", is actually the same instrumental track from Are U Xperienced?, also titled "For the Love of Money".

Track listing

Sample credits
"Thuggish Ruggish Bone" contains a sample of "Mama Used to Say" as performed by Junior
"Foe tha Love of $" contains a sample of "For the Love of Money" as performed by Yomo & Maulkie

Charts

Weekly charts

Year-end charts

Certifications

References

External links
 Bone Thugs-n-Harmony Official Website
 Ruthless Records Official Website

Bone Thugs-n-Harmony albums
1994 EPs
Ruthless Records EPs
Gangsta rap EPs
Albums produced by Rhythum D
G-funk EPs
pt:Bone Thugs-n-Harmony#Álbuns de estúdio